Paul John Hollywood (born 1 March 1966) is an English celebrity chef and television presenter, widely known as a judge on The Great British Bake Off  since 2010.

Hollywood began his career at his father's bakery as a teenager and went on to serve as head baker at a number of British and international hotels. After returning from working in Cyprus, Hollywood appeared as a guest on a number of British television programmes on both BBC and ITV. After beginning his broadcast career in food programming, he diversified into other areas, including motoring.

Early life, education and early career
Hollywood was born in 1966 in Wallasey, Cheshire, the son of bakery proprietor John F. Hollywood and Gillian M. Hollywood (nee Harman). He was a pupil at The Mosslands School. Hollywood studied sculpture at the Wallasey School of Art based at Liscard Hall, but left to start work as a baker. He first worked in his father's bakery in York (the headquarters of a chain called Bread Winner which eventually stretched all the way down the east coast from Aberdeen to Lincolnshire) and then in other bakeries on Merseyside.  He eventually went on to become head baker at a number of hotels including The Dorchester, Chester Grosvenor and Spa, and the Cliveden Hotel. He then left the UK for Cyprus, where he worked at two resorts.

Television and media career
Hollywood has appeared in guest spots on a number of television programmes, including BBC One's The Generation Game, The Heaven and Earth Show, ITV's This Morning, and The Alan Titchmarsh Show. Since the show launched in 2010, Hollywood has been a judge on the BBC programme The Great British Bake Off. In this capacity, he has been described as the "antidote" to judges such as Len Goodman or Simon Cowell in other reality television programmes, on account of his straightforward and honest manner and because his judging is restricted purely to the finished product. His partnership with Mary Berry has been described in The Guardian as being the "secret weapon" of the show and potentially one of the best judging combinations to have appeared on reality television. In September 2016, Love Productions agreed to a three-year deal to move the show from the BBC to Channel 4. Hosts Mel Giedroyc and Sue Perkins announced that they would not be moving to the new network, followed shortly after by Berry. On the same day as Berry, Hollywood announced that he would be staying with the show.

The Gourmand World Cookbook Awards named his 2005 book 100 Great Breads as the "Top Bread and Pastry Book" for that year.

In 2008, Hollywood created an almond and roquefort sourdough recipe that was said to be the most expensive bread in Britain. The roquefort is supplied from a specialist in France at £15 per kilo, while the flour for the bread is made by a miller in Wiltshire. Hollywood describes it as a "Rolls-Royce of loaves". Hollywood is a guest speaker at several food festivals, including the Cumbrian Food Festival, and the BBC Good Food Show and the Cake and Bake Show, both in London. In May 2013, Hollywood began appearing as a judge on The American Baking Competition on CBS.

Hollywood has also starred in Sadie J, a children's television programme. In 2013, he presented Paul Hollywood’s Bread on BBC Two, in which he gave advice on recipes for different types of bread; however, also featured on the series were recipes for some cakes such as the Danish pastry. He also presented Paul Hollywood's Pies and Puds, a cookery television series on BBC One.

In August 2015 Hollywood was featured on the BBC genealogy documentary series Who Do You Think You Are? The programme revealed that his grandfather Norman Harman, who served in the Army during World War II, saw action in the Tunisia Campaign and at the Battle of Anzio and that his great-great-grandfather, Kenneth MacKenzie, had been a policeman in the City of Glasgow Police in the 1850s. Hollywood's great-great-great-grandfather, Donald MacKenzie, had been a crofter in Poolewe, Wester Ross. He covered this distance every week, during his forties, on foot for over a decade. He lived into his 80s.

In May and June 2017 he presented Paul Hollywood's Big Continental Road Trip. In December 2017, Hollywood appeared as a judge on The Great American Baking Show, the second incarnation of the GBBO series in the United States.

November 2019, the four-part series Paul Goes to Hollywood premiered on Food Network; the series follows Paul Hollywood on a 3000-mile culinary road trip across America, travelling from New York to Los Angeles on board a Harley-Davidson.

Hollywood travelled across Japan to discover some of the finest culinary experiences the country has to offer in the three-part Channel 4 series called Paul Hollywood Eats Japan; aired during April–May 2020.

In December 2020, Hollywood was featured in a two-part Channel 4 series called The Great British Bake Off: Best Bits; celebrating some of the most memorable moments from the first ten years of the series.

Later in 2022, the three-part series Paul Hollywood Eats Mexico will premier on Channel 4; the series follows Paul Hollywood as he experiences authentic local cuisine on a culinary tour across Mexico.

Motor racing
In 2015 Hollywood began his racing career, making his debut in the Beechdean AMR Aston Martin Vantage GT4 with Andrew Howard, founder of Beechdean Dairies. The pair qualified second in the Britcar Trophy Championship's first round at Silverstone taking second in class in both races. He also competed at Le Mans in 2015 in the Aston Martin festival. Hollywood has also competed in GT Cup with Jonny Adam and finished first in class. He entered the British GT championship in 2016 and competed in the last three rounds with Jamie Chadwick as his driving partner. In July 2017 he came first in class at the Dunlop endurance race at Silverstone in an Aston Martin GT4, and in November 2017 he raced in his first 24 hr race at Circuit of the Americas coming second in class in an Aston Martin GT8.

Personal life
Hollywood met his former wife Alexandra in Cyprus where he was a head baker at a five star hotel and she was a scuba diving instructor. They later married on the island. They have a son.

Hollywood separated from Alexandra in 2013 after having an affair with his The American Baking Competition co-judge Marcela Valladolid. They later reconciled, then separated again in November 2017. They divorced in July 2019. In August 2019 Hollywood split from 23-year-old girlfriend Summer Monteys-Fullam, ending a two-year relationship.

Bibliography
100 Great Breads (2004) Cassell, London 
How to Bake (2012) Bloomsbury 
Paul Hollywood’s Bread (2013) Bloomsbury, London 
Paul Hollywood’s Pies and Puds (2013) Bloomsbury, London 
Paul Hollywood’s British Baking (2014) Bloomsbury USA  
The Weekend Baker (2016) Michael Joseph, London 
A Baker’s Life (2017)  Bloomsbury, London 
100 Great Breads (2020) Cassell, London 
The Great British Bake Off: Love to Bake (2020) Sphere, London 
Great British Baking Show Book (28 September 2021) Mobius 
Bake (9 June 2022) Bloomsbury Publishing

Notes

References

External links

1966 births
British bakers
English television chefs
People from Wallasey
Living people
BBC television presenters
Britcar drivers
24H Series drivers
English chefs